Paduka Sri Sultan Alauddin Shah ibni Almarhum Raja Kecil Lasa Raja Inu (died 1603) was the fifth Sultan of Perak. He was the son of Raja Kecil Lasa Raja Inu and grandson of the late Sultan Ahmad Tajuddin Shah.

Reign 

In 1594, after Sultan Tajul Ariffin passed away, Raja Ali who was the grandson of Sultan Ahmad Tajuddin Shah was appointed as the 5th Sultan of Perak. He ascended the throne of Perak with the title of Sultan Alauddin Shah and settled by the river in an area now known as Bota Kanan. Sultan Alauddin Shah ruled Perak for about nine years from 1594 to 1603. Sultan Alauddin Shah's government center was located in Bota and during his reign, Aceh still housed several orang-orang besar of Aceh to oversee and administer the Perak Sultanate.

Death 
Sultan Alauddin Shah died in 1603 and was titled Marhum Mangkat di Darat. Originally, he was buried on the banks of the Perak River at the end of Bota Island. When the tomb almost collapsed into the river, the tomb of Sultan Alauddin Shah was moved behind a row of shops in the town of Bota Kanan. The location of the Sultan Alauddin Shah's mausoleum is located in the town of Bota Kanan and is close to the late Sultan Ahmaddin Shah's (18th Sultan of Perak) mausoleum.

There is not much information that can be found regarding the late Sultan Alauddin Shah during his reign as the 5th Sultan of Perak due to the lack of documentation that can be referenced.

References 

Sultans of Perak
1603 deaths
Royal House of Perak
Malay people
People of Malay descent
Muslim monarchs
Sultans
Sunni monarchs
People from Perak